Hayre Manush Rangin Phanush is a National Award-winning song from the 1982 Bangladeshi film Boro Bhalo Lok Chhilo. The song written by veteran poet Syed Shamsul Haque, composed by Alam Khan and sung by Andrew Kishore. Anwar Hossain and Prabir Mitra performed in the song.

Background 
The song was recorded at the Shruti Studio in Magbazar.

Release 

The song was released on 1982 as the part of soundtrack album of the film. After Thirty-six years of the film release, the song was revealed under the banner of G-Series on there official YouTube channel on April 5, 2018.

Accolades

References

External links 
 
 Hayre Manush Rangin Phanush song lyrics on Bangla Tribune (in Bengali)

Bangladeshi film songs
Bengali-language songs
1982 songs
Songs written for films
Bengali film songs
Best Male Playback Singer National Film Award (Bangladesh)-winning songs
Songs with music by Alam Khan (composer)
Andrew Kishore songs